Tarion, formerly known as the Ontario New Home Warranty Program, is a not-for-profit consumer protection organization established by the Government of Ontario in 1976 to administer the province’s new home warranty program. It is financed entirely by new home enrolment fees.

Mission
By law, all new homes built in Ontario are provided with a warranty by the builder. Tarion’s role is to ensure that buyers of newly built homes in Ontario receive the coverage they are entitled to under their builder’s warranty. 

Tarion’s responsibilities include:

 Educating new home buyers and new home owners about their warranty rights and responsibilities;
 Facilitating the fair resolution of disputes between homeowners and builders over warranty coverage, repairs or customer service;
 Assessing warranty claims to determine if they are valid either through an on-site inspection or alternative method of investigation;
 In cases where a builder fails to address a valid warranty claim, resolving the claim directly with the homeowner either through compensation or repairs by a third party; and,
 Managing a guarantee fund to protect new home buyers, out of which compensation for warranty claims is paid.

Effective February 1, 2021, Tarion's previous licensing responsibilities have been transitioned to the Home Construction Regulatory Authority. The HCRA is now responsible for regulating new home builders and vendors in the province.

References

External links
Tarion
Tarion steps in to help Wasaga Beach condo owners
Beware of illegal builders, Tarion CEO warns

Ontario law